Statistics of Veikkausliiga in the 2004 season.

Overview
It was contested by 14 teams, and Haka Valkeakoski won the championship.

League table

Premier Division/Division One 2004, promotion/relegation playoff

MIFK Maarianhamina - Jazz Pori  1-0
Jazz Pori - MIFK Maarianhamina  2-2

MIFK Maarianhamina promoted, Jazz Pori relegated.

Results

References
Finland - List of final tables (RSSSF)

Veikkausliiga seasons
Fin
Fin
1